Kabaddi 4: The Final Match is a 2022 Nepali romantic comedy film, directed by Ram Babu Gurung. The film, which is the fourth and final film in the Kabaddi franchise, is produced by Mani Ram Pokharel, Om Chand Rauniyar and Sushma Gurung under the banner of Baasuri Films. The leading roles are played by Nabin Luhagun Dayahang Rai, Saugat Malla, Miruna Magar, Buddhi Tamang and Bijaya Baral.

Kabbadi 4 had a budget of Rs. 3 crore, making it one of the most expensive Nepali films. The film received mixed to positive response from critics with praise directed towards screenplay, performance of Dayahang Rai and Saugat Malla, music, authenticity and direction of Gurung but some critics criticized the film's routine story and inferior to previous Kabaddi series. The film broke several records at the box office setting records for a highest single day collection in Nepal with over Rs. 3 crore and went on to become the Highest Grossing Nepali film in Nepal and second highest grossing film in Nepal.

Plot 
Kaji (Dayahang Rai) resolves to become a monk and live a solitary life because he no longer has any hope of finding a bride. However, his parents are not satisfied with this decision; his father now wants to remarry in order to preserve the family lineage. Then, Kaji's mother asks Chhantyal (Buddhi Tamang) and B.K. (Bijaya Baral), two of Kaji's close friends, to locate him. They bring her to Kaji, where she requests him to return home, which he refuses to do. She then threatens to hang herself if Kaji's father marries again as a result of his decision to become a monk. After hearing it, Kaji returns home and resumes his duties as the school's chairman. He hires a new teacher Shanti (Miruna Magar), who seems to have feelings for him. She keeps trying to flirt with Kaji, but he brushes her off each time.

Now that he has a master's degree in mathematics, Bam Kaji (Saugat Malla) has returned to the village. In some informal chats, he is asked to be married by his parents because Maiya, his ex-wife, has left him. He rejects the idea that any lady in the village is deserving of being his wife. He makes the decision to return to the city. He sees Shanti (Miruna Magar) on his way back to the city and instantly falls in love with her. He returns to his home after deciding to remain in the village. He then requests that his father provide him with employment at the same institution where Shanti is a teacher. He is appointed as a math instructor.

Bam Kaji often attempts to flirt with Shanti but she seems to ignore him, while Shanti constantly tries to flirt with Kaji but he keeps ignoring her. Kaji agrees when Shanti requests a few days off to go visit her mother, who resides in a different village. Moreover, she requests him to accompany her. He initially declines, but when his mother insists that he go because Shanti's village is far away and it is his responsibility to get her safely to her home, he agrees.

The following day, Kaji finds Bam Kaji preparing to travel with them while mounted on a horse. Thereafter, the three of them depart for her home. Later, after walking a long distance, Shanti asks Bam Kaji if she can ride on his horse, and he immediately agrees. When they arrive at her house, they learn that her mother is the only member of her family. She speaks with Kaji and Shanti and expresses no concerns about their choice to be married. Kaji is shocked after hearing it, he tells them he never expressed her anything regarding this matter.

Shanti presents a letter with Kaji's name on it, and Kaji closes the talk by joking that it appears to be a love letter. When Kaji got back home, he realized the letter was written by Bam Kaji, but B.K. had removed "Bam" and only left "Kaji" in the letter before leaving it on Shanti's desk. Bam Kaji never says he wants a reply to his "letter" but asks Shanti for her response. He only requests her response, and she assures him that he will receive it shortly. He gladly accepts the envelope she hands him, examines it later, and realizes it wasn't a letter in response to his letter which he expected. It was his suspension letter as an instructor at the school for his unprofessional behavior. He gets furious at Kaji for suspending him; he tries several times to get his job back, but Kaji never gives him his job back.

Bam Kaji is drunk and seeks to acquire Shanti by getting rid of Kaji. He pulls the knife out and moves to murder Kaji. His father stops him and beats him vigorously, because he is angry that Bam Kaji wants to kill his own cousin because of a girl. They then go to Shanti’s home to talk about getting her married to Bam Kaji, which she declines instantly. Thinking of his last resort, Bam Kaji decides to kidnap her and marry her since it is acceptable in their culture.

Shanti gets abducted by Bam Kaji, who then brings her to his residence. Kaji’s father tells him about this incident, where he blames Kaji for not being man enough to protect her. He praises Bam Kaji for being a real man. Kaji then realizes his love for Shanti. While at the marriage ceremony of Bam Kaji and Shanti, B.K.’s father announces there is a dead body in the yard, everyone runs to see it. Taking this opportunity, Kaji runs away from the ceremony with Shanti. Bam Kaji gets to know that he has been tricked; he runs to find Kaji and Shanti. When he eventually caught them, it was B.K. and Chhantyal disguised as Kaji and Shanti. Bam Kaji gets furious and starts screaming; he walks away, thinking of the moments he spent with Shanti. Kaji and Shanti are now walking together where she asks him to at least propose to her now. He replies there is no need to do it, since she should already know it by now.

Cast
 Dayahang Rai as Kaji
 Saugat Malla as Bam Kaji
 Miruna Magar as Shanti
 Buddhi Tamang as Chhantyal
 Bijaya Baral as Bir Kaji/B.K.
 Kabita

Controversy
Miruna Magar slapped a monk in public and claimed that he touched her inappropriately. A monk asked her for forgiveness, but she filed a case against him; she later took back the case. Many thought this was an act of publicity by an actress, for which reason the film was banned in Indian state of Sikkim.

Music

References

External links

2022 films
Nepalese romantic comedy films
Nepalese sequel films